The Riveter is a 1940 American Donald Duck short film directed by Dick Lundy and produced by Walt Disney. In the short film, Donald lands a job working high steel as a riveter for construction foreman Pete.

Plot 
Donald comes across a sign next to a construction site requesting a riveter, so he decides to take the job. However, he messes things up and gets in hot water with his boss, Peg Leg Pete.

Voice cast
 Clarence Nash as Donald Duck
 Billy Bletcher as Pete

Music
Donald enters the cartoon singing "Heigh Ho" from Snow White and the Seven Dwarfs.

Releases

Television 
 Good Morning, Mickey, episode #57
 Goofy's Guide to Success
 Mickey's Mouse Tracks, episode #63
 The Ink and Paint Club, episode #1.11: "The Many Lives of Pegleg Pete"

Home media
The short was released on May 18, 2004, on Walt Disney Treasures: The Chronological Donald, Volume One: 1934-1941.

It can also be found on VHS on Walt Disney Cartoon Classics: Limited Gold Editions - Donald with the original opening and closing titles.

References

External links 
 
 The Riveter at The Internet Animation Database

Donald Duck short films
Films produced by Walt Disney
1940s Disney animated short films
Films directed by Jack Hannah
Films scored by Oliver Wallace
1940 animated films
1940 films